John Bowne High School is a public high school located in Flushing, New York City and has an enrollment of nearly four thousand  students. The school, which opened in 1964, is named after the English immigrant John Bowne.
John Bowne High School offers multiple programs including a science research program, a law program, a creative arts program, writing program, and an agriculture program.

S.T.E.M 
S.T.E.M is the name of Bowne's science research program. It puts the students though a variety of tasks in the areas of Science, Technology, Engineering, and Math.

The Doshi students are also able to compete in a variety of competitions such as Bridge Building.

Academy for Creative Artists 
Center for Writing (CFW) is an intensive writing program offered by the school that focuses on certain aspects of writing that are not found in the other programs.

For the 2015 school year, Center for Writing was renamed Academy for Creative Artists (ACA), aiming for drama and acting rather than just writing.

Agriculture 
John Bowne contains its own 3.8 acre farm which the Agriculture program uses to teach agriculture related activities. A farm located within the vicinity of the school provides students enrolled into the program exposure and experience with farm related work. The two concentrations within the program are Animal Science and Plant Science. There are many different types of Plants, and Animals as well, for hands-on learning.

Sports 
John Bowne's male athletic teams consist of: Varsity Baseball and JV Baseball, Varsity Basketball and JV Basketball, Varsity Bowling, Coed Cricket, Cross Country, Coed Golf, Varsity Handball, Indoor Track, Outdoor Track, Varsity Soccer, Varsity Tennis, Varsity Volleyball, and Varsity Wrestling.

John Bowne's female athletic teams consist of: Varsity Basketball, Cross Country, Varsity Handball, Indoor Track, Outdoor Track, Varsity Soccer, Varsity Tennis, Varsity Volleyball, JV Volleyball and Varsity Softball.

In 1994, the John Bowne Men's Varsity Tennis team placed dead last losing all regular season meets.  In 1998, the Men's Varsity Tennis team went undefeated during the regular season and went on to win the NYC divisional championship on court at the USTA. Two of the three singles players advanced to the third round at the state level.

In 2011, the Varsity Baseball team won the B City Championship by defeating Van Buren in the finals at MCU Park 2–1.

Notable students and alumni 
Notable students and alumni include the following:

Jerry Beck – animation historian
Hamidou Diallo – professional basketball player (transferred to Putnam Science Academy)
Adele Diamond - Professor of Neuroscience at the University of British Columbia and Tier 1 Canada Research Chair in the field of Developmental Cognitive Neuroscience 
Ehinomen Ehikhamenor – boxer and star on the television show The Contender
Ibram X. Kendi - professor and author of How to be an Anti-Racist and Stamped from the Beginning: The Definitive History of Racist Ideas in America 
Kevin Kelley – boxer
Robert Marks – vocal coach, music arranger, accompanist, author, and music director  
Main Source – hip hop group
Steve Ratzer – Major League Baseball player
Heathcliff Slocumb – former Major League Baseball relief pitcher
Harvey Weinstein – former film producer and founder of Miramax Films and the Weinstein Company; convicted sex offender on February 24, 2020 after he was found guilty on 3 counts of sexual abuse cases starting in October 2017
Bob Weinstein – film producer and co-founder of Miramax Films and the Weinstein Company

References

Educational institutions established in 1964
Public high schools in Queens, New York
Flushing, Queens
1964 establishments in New York City